Mindi is a suburb area  in Visakhapatnam, Andhra Pradesh, India.

Entertainment
Globex Shopping Mall is at NH Road accessible here. There is a multiplex with 5 screens.

Transport
APSRTC buses are available here from city.

APSRTC routes

References

Neighbourhoods in Visakhapatnam